Hasarinella is a genus of spiders in the family Salticidae. It was first described in 2012 by Wanda Wesołowska. , the World Spider Catalog lists three African species.

References

Salticidae genera
Taxa named by Wanda Wesołowska
Spiders of Africa
Salticidae